Serrata is a comune (municipality) in the Province of Reggio Calabria in the Italian region Calabria, located about  southwest of Catanzaro and about 60 km northeast of Reggio Calabria.

Serrata borders the following municipalities: Candidoni, Dinami, Laureana di Borrello, Mileto, San Pietro di Caridà.

Demographic evolution

References

Cities and towns in Calabria